The 2015–16 Copa Catalunya was the 27th staging of the Copa Catalunya. The competition began on 1 and 2 August 2015 and was played by teams in Segunda División, Segunda División B, Tercera División and the top teams of Primera Catalana.

Tournament

First round

The first round was drawn on June 30 and was played on July 31, August 1 and 2.

Bye: Reus

Second round

The second round was drawn on June 30 and was played on August 8, 9 and 11.

Third round

The third round was drawn on June 30 and was played on August 15 and 16.

Bye: Rubí

Quarterfinals

The quarterfinals round was drawn on August 31 and was played on September 30 and October 7.

Semifinals

The semifinals round was drawn on October 13 and played on November 11 and December 8.

Final

External links
Federació Catalana de Futbol 

Cata
Copa Catalunya seasons
Copa